Brian Moriarty (born 1956) is an American video game developer who authored three of the original Infocom interactive fiction titles, Wishbringer (1985),  Trinity (1986), and Beyond Zork (1987), as well as Loom (1990) for LucasArts.

Career
Prior to joining Infocom, Moriarty was a Technical Editor for the Atari 8-bit computer magazine ANALOG Computing. He wrote two text adventures for ANALOG: Adventure in the 5th Dimension (1983) and Crash Dive! (1984).  He also worked on Tachyon (1985), an adaptation of Atari's Quantum arcade game, which was previewed but never published.

Moriarty joined Lucasfilm Games, later known as LucasArts, in 1988 at the invitation of Noah Falstein.  There he designed his first graphic adventure game, Loom, published in 1990. Though the game was a commercial success and Moriarty had an idea for sequels which were briefly entertained, he opted to move on to other projects.

After working on an unreleased game based on The Young Indiana Jones Chronicles for the studio's educational division, he took over The Dig, a science fiction adventure game based on an idea from Steven Spielberg. The project had a notoriously lengthy and troubled development, with Moriarty leading the second of ultimately three incarnations the game underwent before finally shipping in 1995. When his version of the project collapsed in 1993, Moriarty departed LucasArts and joined the now defunct Rocket Science Games.

In 1995 Moriarty became the head of game design for the online gaming service Mpath.

On occasion, Moriarty delivers public lectures. One of these, his 2002 Game Developers Conference presentation "The Secret of Psalm 46," has been adapted into a dramatic production  and a graphic novel, and was included in its entirety as a video Easter egg in Jonathan Blow's puzzle game The Witness (2016).

Moriarty is a Professor of Practice in the Interactive Media and Game Development program at Worcester Polytechnic Institute.

Games

ANALOG Computing
 Adventure in the 5th Dimension (1983)
 Crash Dive! (1984)
 Tachyon (1985, unpublished)

Infocom
 Wishbringer (1985)
 Trinity (1986) 
 Beyond Zork (1987)
 Timesink (unpublished)

Lucasfilm Games / LucasArts Entertainment
 Loom (1990)
 Young Indiana Jones at the World's Fair (unpublished)
 The Dig (1995) - Credited for "Additional Additional Story"

Rocket Science Games
Loadstar: The Legend of Tully Bodine (1994) - Credited for "interactive design"

Other software
 The Black Rabbit (1982, Atari 8-bit) - single-drive disk duplicator
 Snail (1983, Atari 8-bit) - disk drive RPM checker
 mUSE: A BASIC Memory Monitor (1983, Atari 8-bit) - programming utility

References

External links
A biography of Moriarty from infocom-if.org
Brian Moriarty: Lectures & Presentations
Brian Moriarty's Home Page

1956 births
American video game designers
Infocom
Interactive fiction writers
Living people
Video game programmers
Worcester Polytechnic Institute faculty
Lucasfilm people